Kathy Tremblay (born 16 June 1982) is a professional Canadian triathlete and member of the National Team.

Tremblay placed 31st in the 2008 Summer Olympics.
Tremblay holds a degree in PR and Management (Relations industrielles, relations publiques et création d'entreprises). She lives in Montreal and is coached by her boyfriend David-James Taché.

Along with fellow Canadian triathlete Paula Findlay, Tremblay qualified for the triathlon event at the 2012 Summer Olympics.

ITU Competitions 
In the eleven years from 2000 to 2010, Tremblay took part in 52 ITU competitions and achieved 20 top ten positions.

The list is based upon the official ITU rankings and the Athlete's Profile Page.
Unless indicated otherwise, the following events are triathlons (Olympic Distance) and belong to the Elite category.

References

External links
 Kathy Tremblay's website

1982 births
Living people
Canadian female triathletes
Olympic triathletes of Canada
People from Sainte-Foy, Quebec City
Sportspeople from Quebec City
Triathletes at the 2007 Pan American Games
Triathletes at the 2008 Summer Olympics
Triathletes at the 2011 Pan American Games
Triathletes at the 2012 Summer Olympics
Pan American Games competitors for Canada
20th-century Canadian women
21st-century Canadian women